Hydrodytes is a genus of predaceous diving beetles in the family Dytiscidae. There are at least three described species in Hydrodytes. It is found in North America and the Neotropics.

Species
These three species belong to the genus Hydrodytes:
 Hydrodytes dodgei (Young, 1989)
 Hydrodytes inaciculatus (Guignot, 1957)
 Hydrodytes opalinus (Zimmermann, 1921)

References

Further reading

 
 
 
 
 

Dytiscidae